Kamren Curl (born March 3, 1999) is an American football strong safety for the Washington Commanders of the National Football League (NFL). He played college football at Arkansas and was drafted by Washington in the seventh round of the 2020 NFL Draft.

College career
Curl was born on March 3, 1999, in San Diego, California. He and his family later moved to Muskogee, Oklahoma, where he attended Muskogee High School. A three-star recruit, Curl committed to Arkansas over offers from schools such as Baylor, Nebraska, Oklahoma, TCU, Texas, and Texas Tech. As a true freshman there, he started 12 games at cornerback before switching to safety for his sophomore season, where he had 53 tackles and five pass breakups in 11 games. As a junior, Curl had 76 tackles, two interceptions, and two sacks.

Professional career

Curl was selected by the Washington Redskins in the seventh round (216th overall) of the 2020 NFL Draft. He signed his four-year rookie contract on July 22, 2020. Curl took over as the starting strong safety after Landon Collins suffered a season-ending injury in Week 8. The following week against the New York Giants, Curl led the team with 11 tackles and recorded his first career sack. He recorded his first career interception in a Week 14 game against the San Francisco 49ers, which he also returned 76 yards for a touchdown. He finished the season with 3 interceptions, 88 tackles, 2 quarterback sacks and 4 passes defended.

In the 2021 Week 10 win over the Tampa Bay Buccaneers, Curl popped the ball loose from Buccaneers receiver Jaelon Darden which was intercepted by cornerback William Jackson III. On December 16, 2021, Curl was placed on the team's COVID-19 reserve list and was forced to miss the Week 15 game against the Philadelphia Eagles. He was placed back on the active roster on December 24.

After receiving thumb surgery on his right hand, Curl missed Weeks 1 and 2 of the 2022 season.

Statistics

References

External links

Washington Commanders bio
Arkansas Razorbacks bio

1999 births
Living people
American football cornerbacks
American football safeties
Arkansas Razorbacks football players
Players of American football from Oklahoma
Players of American football from San Diego
Sportspeople from Muskogee, Oklahoma
Washington Commanders players
Washington Football Team players